{|

{{Infobox ship career
|Ship country=
|Ship flag=
|Ship name=*LST 3041 (1944–48)
Empire Doric (1948–56)
LST 3041 (1956–60)
|Ship ordered=
|Ship builder=Harland and Wolff, Govan
|Ship laid down=
|Ship launched=31 October 1944
|Ship yard number=1297
|Ship owner=*Royal Navy (1944–48)
Ministry of Transport (1948–60)
|Ship operator=*Royal Navy (1944–48)
Atlantic Steam Navigation Company (1948–56)
Royal Navy (1956–60)
|Ship registry=* Royal Navy (1944–48)
 London, United Kingdom (1948–56)
 Royal Navy (1956–60)
|Ship acquired=
|Ship commissioned= 1944–48, 1956–60
|Ship decommissioned=1948–56
|Ship route=Preston–Larne (1948–56)
|Ship nickname=
|Ship honours=
|Ship fate=Scrapped 1960
|Ship notes=
}}

|}LST 3041 was a Landing Ship, Tank that served in the Royal Navy at the end of World War II, before being converted to a commercial ferry. She was later requisitioned by the Navy during the Suez Crisis, and was scrapped in 1960.

Description

HistoryLST 3041 was built by Harland and Wolff, Govan. Yard number 1267, she was launched on 31 October 1944.

The crew joined her in Scotland and took part in shakedown trials in which they would run the ship ashore and use the stern anchor to pull themselves off.

World War II
In the summer of 1945, loaded with tanks, troops, and a troop landing craft, she sailed to the Suez Canal. After unloading there, she sailed through the Canal to take part in the invasion of Japan. She was also used to transport rice from Thailand to Singapore. It was during this period that she visited Bombay, where instead of having a tug pull her into the channel she won the tug-of-war and managed to capsize the tug.

After returning through the Suez she was refitted, and the rivets in the bottom of the hull that had been worn by repeated landings were replaced in drydock. She finally returned to England in 1947 via Malta and Gibraltar.

Commercial ferry
In 1948, she was chartered to F. Bustard & Sons, the Atlantic Steam Navigation Company and was renamed Empire Doric. Her port of registry was London. The LSTs became one of the forerunners of the modern roll on-roll off (RO-RO) car ferries. She was placed into service on the Preston – Larne route. ASN was nationalized under the British Transport Commission in 1954.

Suez
During the Suez Crisis, the ship was requisitioned by the Royal Navy and renamed LST 3041. She sailed to Port Said where she offloaded Centurion tanks, and where she struck a sunken vessel. As a result of this collision, she had to call in at Naples on the way home for repairs and was in drydock until early January 1957. She remained in use until 1960. LST 3041'' arrived on 13 January 1960 at Glasgow for scrapping by Smith, Houston & Co Ltd, Port Glasgow.

References

1944 ships
Ships built in Govan
LST (3)-class tank landing ships
Steamships of the United Kingdom
Empire ships
Merchant ships of the United Kingdom
Suez Crisis
Ships built by Harland and Wolff